Dalías is a municipality of Almería province, in the autonomous community of Andalusia, Spain.

Demographics

References

Municipalities in the Province of Almería